Huy is a municipality in the district of Harz, in Saxony-Anhalt, Germany, established in April 2002 by the merger of eleven former municipalities. It is named after the small Huy hill range and situated about 10 kilometres northwest of Halberstadt.

Huy municipality consists of the following 11 Ortschaften or municipal divisions (former municipalities):

 Aderstedt
 Anderbeck
 Badersleben
 Dedeleben
 Dingelstedt am Huy
 Eilenstedt
 Eilsdorf
 Huy-Neinstedt
 Pabstorf
 Schlanstedt
 Vogelsdorf

References